Researcher (foaled May 5, 2004, in Virginia) is a Thoroughbred racehorse who competed mostly in the United States. He was bred by the Virginia Tech Foundation, Inc.

A horse from the most humble beginnings , Researcher was bought by Rutledge Farm (Mr. Hermen Greenberg), in 2005, as a $5,000 charitable donation  to the Virginia Tech Foundation's M.A.R.E Center, in Middleburg, Virginia.  One year after winning the 1st Charles Town Classic, and only a few days before winning the 2nd Charles Town Classic, April 16, 2010, Mr. Zohar Ben-Dov (Kinross Farm) bought Researcher from Mr. Greenberg's estate, for an undisclosed sum. (Mr. Greenberg died February 28, 2010.)

A rare combination of stamina and speed, "Researcher is every horseman's dream..."—a "push button" horse , known for his adaptability.

Millionaire Status
Researcher became a "millionaire" on April 17, 2010, when he earned $600,000 for winning the 2nd Annual $1 Million Charles Town Classic.  (He had previously earned $800,129.)

As of April 20, 2010, Researcher is listed as 2010's 4th Leading Money Earner  in North America.

2009's Highest Speed Figure
Researcher earned a record 133 Equibase Speed Figure in 2009's Inaugural Charles Town Classic.

 His 133 Speed Figure was higher than any other horse competing in any other 2009 race in North America.  (2009 Breeders' Cup Classic champion Zenyatta only scored a 127, and Rachael Alexandra only scored a 121 in both the 2009 Kentucky Oaks and Haskell Invitational.)
 No horse, in 2011, 2010, 2009, 2008, 2007, or 2006, has run a faster Equibase Speed Figure.  (note: Equibase Speed Figures are only available, as far back as 2006, online.)

Charles Town Classic
Researcher was the lone local horse, in a 10-horse field, when he beat Commentator to steal the show  at Charles Town Races and Slots, winning the 1st Annual Charles Town Classic, on April 18, 2009.

On April 17, 2010, Researcher defended his title , in the 2nd Annual $1 million Charles Town Classic by winning over a game Awesome Gem.  His time was just a fraction off the track's record he set on 3/28/2009.repeated

Awards
The late Hermen Greenberg’s Researcher was named 2009 Champion Virginia-bred Older Male on the strength of his wins in the 2009 $500,000 Charles Town Classic Stakes (L) and his second-place finish in the 2009 $100,000 Queens Country Handicap Gr. III at Aqueduct. By Two Smart, out of Wild Magnolia by Apalachee, Researcher won four other West Virginia stakes races while earning $492,859 for 2009.

Major Wins and Track Records
 APRIL 17, 2010  
2nd Annual $1 Million Charles Town Classic
1 mile - 1:49.94
Won by 1 lengths
Beyer Speed Figure - 108
Equibase Speed Figure - 113
 APRIL 18, 2009  
1st Annual Charles Town Classic
1 mile - 1:49.86
Won by 2 lengths
Beyer Speed Figure - 107
Equibase Speed Figure - 133
 MARCH 28, 2009  -- (A New Track Record)
$40,000 Allowance Race
1 mile - 1:49.76
Won by 22 lengths
Beyer Speed Figure - 106

Overall Charles Town Racing Record (as of 4-17-2010)

14: 12 - 2 - 0  (14 starts: 12 wins - 2 places - 0 shows)

Profile and Statistics
 Blood Horse Profile -

Pedigree
 Researcher's pedigree and racing stats

Videos
 Charles Town Classic 2010 Video, Charles Town - April 17, 2010
 Charles Town Classic 2009 Video, Charles Town - April 18, 2009
 Queens Country Handicap Video, Aqueduct - December 13, 2008
HBPA Governor's Cup Video, Charles Town - October 16, 2009
HBPA Governor's Cup Video, Charles Town - October 17, 2008

News & Links
Fan Page on Facebook
 Thoroughbred Time - Local Star Shines Again In Charles Town Classic
 Blood Horse - Another Classic Victory By Researcher
 BrisNet - Researcher Delivers Title Defense In Charles Town Classic
 Blood Horse - Researcher Goes For CT Classic Repeat
 ESPN - "Researcher Takes CT Classic"
 Blood Horse - Researcher Right At Home In CT Classic
 Thoroughbred Times - "Researcher Outshines Commentator at Charles Town"
 Daily Racing Form - Researcher Does Hokies Proud
 Blood Horse - Researcher Finds Queens County Formula
 Blood Horse -  Big Names Nominated to Charles Town Classic
 Equibase - Researcher's 133 is 2009's fastest Equibase Speed Figure
 Virginia Thoroughbred Blog - Virginia-Bred Champions Honored At Colonial Downs

Virginia Tech
2004 racehorse births
Thoroughbred family 5-i
Racehorses bred in Virginia
Racehorses trained in the United States

ja:アインシュタイン (競走馬)